C. occultus may refer to:
 Centropogon occultus, a plant species
 Chthonius occultus, a pseudoscorpion species in the genus Chthonis
 Cryptoerithus occultus, a spider species in the genus Cryptoerithus
 Ctenomys occultus, a rodent species

See also
 Occultus (disambiguation)